Still Feel Gone is the second album by American alternative country pioneers Uncle Tupelo. It was released in 1991 on Rockville Records and re-released in 2003 by Sony Legacy.

Reception 

Still Feel Gone has been generally well received by critics. Pitchfork called the album "so much stronger" than Uncle Tupelo's debut No Depression.

Track listing
All songs written by Jay Farrar, Mike Heidorn, and Jeff Tweedy except where noted.
"Gun" – 3:40
"Looking for a Way Out" – 3:40
"Fall Down Easy" – 3:08
"Nothing" – 2:16
"Still Be Around" – 2:44
"Watch Me Fall" – 2:12
"Punch Drunk" – 2:43
"Postcard" – 3:38
"D. Boon" – 2:32
"True to Life" – 2:22
"Cold Shoulder" – 3:15
"Discarded" – 2:42
"If That's Alright" – 3:12

2003 CD reissue bonus tracks
 Sauget Wind (Farrar) – 3:31
"I Wanna Destroy You (The Soft Boys Cover)" (Robyn Hitchcock) – 2:30
"Watch Me Fall" (Demo Version) – 2:08
"Looking for a Way Out" (Demo – Fast Version) – 2:03
"If That's Alright" (Demo – Fast Acoustic Version) – 3:03
Tracks 16–18 previously unreleased.

Personnel
 Jay Farrar – electric and acoustic guitars, vocals, banjo, mandolin, harmonica
 Jeff Tweedy – bass, vocals; acoustic guitar (tracks 1, 13)
 Mike Heidorn – drums
Additional personnel
 Chris Bess – piano (track 3), accordion (track 6)
 Sean Slade – organ (tracks 5, 6), piano (track 11)
 Gary Louris – additional electric guitar (tracks 6, 8, 11)
 Brian Henneman – acoustic guitar (track 10)
 Rich Gilbert – Optigan (track 13)

References 

Uncle Tupelo albums
1991 albums
Albums produced by Paul Q. Kolderie
Albums produced by Sean Slade
Dutch East India Trading albums